is a Japanese animator, director and character designer. He has directed Ninja Cadets, Kodomo no Jikan, Whispered Words, Mashiroiro Symphony, and Karneval.

Filmography

References

External links
 
 

Japanese animators
Japanese animated film directors
Anime directors
Anime character designers
Living people
Year of birth missing (living people)